Eero Hyökyvirta (born 17 March 1999) is a Finnish professional footballer who plays for JJK, on loan from FC Ilves, as a midfielder.

References

1999 births
Living people
Finnish footballers
Klubi 04 players
HIFK Fotboll players
IF Gnistan players
FC Ilves players
JJK Jyväskylä players
Veikkausliiga players
Ykkönen players
Kakkonen players
Association football midfielders